Marc Lawrence (born October 22, 1959) is an American director, screenwriter, and producer. 

Lawrence is best known for his numerous collaborations with Sandra Bullock and Hugh Grant. He wrote the comedy films Forces of Nature (1999), Miss Congeniality (2000), and Miss Congeniality 2: Armed and Fabulous (2005). He wrote and directed the comedy films Two Weeks Notice (2002), Music and Lyrics (2007), Did You Hear About the Morgans? (2009), The Rewrite (2014), and Noelle (2019).

Early life
Lawrence was born on October 22, 1959, in Brooklyn. In 1981, he graduated from Binghamton University with a degree in English and attended New York University School of Law for one year.

Career
Lawrence moved to Los Angeles after college and served as a staff writer and then supervising producer on NBC's Family Ties from 1984 to 1989.

Lawrence has written films such as Life with Mikey (1993), Forces of Nature (1999), the remake of The Out-of-Towners (1999), Miss Congeniality (2000), and its sequel Miss Congeniality 2: Armed and Fabulous (2005). He has both written and directed Two Weeks Notice (2002), Music and Lyrics (2007), Did You Hear About the Morgans? (2009), The Rewrite (2014), and Noelle (2019).

Personal life
Lawrence met his wife, Linda, when he was in college. The couple lives in New York City and have three children: Clyde, Gracie, and Linus. Clyde and Gracie are the frontman and frontwoman of an 8-piece soul-pop band, Lawrence, and are signed to Jon Bellion's record label, Beautiful Mind Records.

Filmography

Film

Television
The numbers in credits refer to the number of episodes.

Music

References

External links

1959 births
Living people
20th-century American male writers
20th-century American screenwriters
21st-century American male writers
21st-century American screenwriters
American male screenwriters
American male television writers
Binghamton University alumni
Film directors from New York City
New York University School of Law alumni
Screenwriters from New York (state)
Writers from Brooklyn